Cyclopropanetrione or  trioxocyclopropane is a little-known oxide of carbon with formula C3O3.  It consists of a ring of three carbon atoms each attached to an oxygen atom with a double bond.  Alternately, it can be thought as a trimer of carbon monoxide. This compound is thermodynamically unstable and has not been produced in bulk.  However, it has been detected using mass spectrometry.

It is the neutral equivalent of the deltate anion C3O32−, known since 1975.  An equivalent hydrate  hexahydroxycyclopropane or cyclopropane-1,1,2,2,3,3-hexol, (-C(OH)2-)3 also exists.  This contains geminal hydroxy groups.

References

Oxocarbons
Cyclopropanes
Triketones
Cyclic ketones
Conjugated ketones